Akron is a borough in Lancaster County, Pennsylvania. As of the 2020 census it had a population of 4,169,

History 
Akron was incorporated as a borough in 1895. Before this point, a small village called New Berlin sat at the center of the borough. A railroad used to run through Akron and served a railroad station in the town. A trolley also used to run in parts of the borough. The railroad has since been abandoned and is now the Warwick to Ephrata Rail Trail.

Geography
Akron is located in northern Lancaster County at  (40.156472, -76.204000). It is bordered to the north by the borough of Ephrata. Two main roads pass through the borough: Main Street and 7th Street (Pennsylvania Route 272).

The borough is located on a hill. Cocalico Creek forms part of the northern border of the borough and loops past the west side of the borough, leading to the Conestoga River, a tributary of the Susquehanna.

Demographics

As of the census of 2000, there were 4,046 people, 1,622 households, and 1,138 families residing in the borough. The population density was 3,199.8 people per square mile (1,239.8/km²). There were 1,687 housing units at an average density of 1,334.2 per square mile (516.9/km²). The racial makeup of the borough was 96.42% White, 0.54% Black or African American, 0.22% Native American, 1.38% Asian, 0.79% from other races, and 0.64% from two or more races. 2.22% of the population were Hispanic or Latino of any race.

There were 1,622 households, out of which 27.7% had children under the age of 18 living with them, 60.5% were married couples living together, 7.4% had a female householder with no husband present, and 29.8% were non-families. 24.8% of all households were made up of individuals, and 9.1% had someone living alone who was 65 years of age or older. The average household size was 2.41 and the average family size was 2.86.

In the borough the population was spread out, with 21.7% under the age of 18, 6.5% from 18 to 24, 28.3% from 25 to 44, 24.2% from 45 to 64, and 19.3% who were 65 years of age or older. The median age was 41 years. For every 100 females there were 89.9 males. For every 100 females age 18 and over, there were 89.3 males.

The median income for a household in the borough was $45,407, and the median income for a family was $53,365. Males had a median income of $37,061 versus $24,545 for females. The per capita income for the borough was $19,983. About 3.4% of families and 4.6% of the population were below the poverty line, including 4.9% of those under age 18 and 8.1% of those age 65 or over.

Schools

Elementary
 Akron Elementary (Ephrata Area School District)

Police, government, and fire protection 
Akron borough is an independent local government unit located in Lancaster County. It is run by an elected borough council and an elected mayor. The current mayor is John McBeth. The borough council is currently run by President Nathan Imhoff. Established in 1893, the Akron Volunteer Fire Company Lancaster County Station 12 has approximately 50 active members and three pieces of current operating fire apparatus: one engine, one rescue engine, and one squad.

Economy 
The economy is mostly made up of small businesses. There are very few large businesses because the town is small and mostly residential. The American headquarters of the Mennonite Central Committee, which started the Fair Trade retailer Ten Thousand Villages, and Mennonite Disaster Service, are located in the town. The locally well-known Weisers Market is also in Akron.

Recreation 

Loyd H. Roland Memorial Park (also known as Akron Park), is a 70-plus acre park located on Main Street on the east side of Akron. The park has baseball fields, tennis courts, a beach volleyball court, a basketball court, a playground, hiking trails, a pond, picnic pavilions, a gazebo, and an 18-hole disc golf course.

Culture
Akron is one of the many Pennsylvania towns to drop or raise a unique item at midnight on New Year's Eve. The "Shoe-In" begins several hours before midnight with children's activities, carriage rides, music, and a bonfire. People donate children's shoes which are passed on to the needy. In honor of the area's former shoemaking industry (that used to be located where the Ten-Thousand Villages corporate offices are currently located) a giant sneaker is lowered at midnight.

References

External links

Populated places established in 1884
Boroughs in Lancaster County, Pennsylvania
1884 establishments in Pennsylvania